Milan Abeysekera (born 30 November 1993) is a Sri Lankan cricketer. He made his List A debut for Ampara District in the 2016–17 Districts One Day Tournament on 15 March 2017.

References

External links
 

1993 births
Living people
Sri Lankan cricketers
Ampara District cricketers
Nondescripts Cricket Club cricketers
Cricketers from Colombo